Tyson Kidd and Cesaro were a professional wrestling tag team in WWE. They are former WWE Tag Team Champions. They formed a tag team in December 2014, and were accompanied to the ring by Natalya, Kidd's real-life wife. While the team had no official name, they were unofficially called the "Masters of the WWE Universe", a reference to the Masters of the Universe franchise, and the "Brass Ring Club", a reference to the New Japan Pro-Wrestling stable Bullet Club as well as a criticism of Cesaro from WWE chairman Vince McMahon. Other nicknames included BTE (Best Team Ever) and #FACT.

History 
Kidd and Cesaro first teamed on the December 1 episode of Raw, when they were eliminated from a gauntlet match for a shot at the tag team titles by The Usos. In January 2015, Kidd formed an official alliance with Cesaro. The pair dubbed themselves "The Brass Ring Club" and proceeded to pick up multiple wins over Los Matadores, as well as allying with Adam Rose to feud with The New Day. At the Royal Rumble, Kidd and Cesaro defeated New Day members Big E and Kofi Kingston, before entering the Royal Rumble match at #12 (Kidd) and #28 (Cesaro) and being eliminated by Daniel Bryan and Dolph Ziggler respectively. According to the Wrestling Observer, originally Rose was set to join the duo to form a faction, indicated by the "Brass Ring Club" shirts worn by the trio throughout January, but those plans were nixed following the Royal Rumble.

At Fastlane on February 22, Kidd and Cesaro defeated The Usos to capture the WWE Tag Team Championship, a title Kidd had not held for nearly 5 years. They retained their title in a rematch the following night on Raw after Natalya caused a disqualification, cementing her as a villainess in solidarity with the duo. At WrestleMania 31, Kidd and Cesaro retained their title by defeating The Usos, Los Matadores and The New Day in a Fatal-4-Way tag team match. At Extreme Rules, Kidd and Cesaro lost their titles to rivals; The New Day when Kofi Kingston held onto Cesaro's tights for the pin, ending their reign at 63 days. After The New Day turned heel, Cesaro and Kidd became faces for the first time as a tag team (also marking Cesaro's first true face turn in the WWE). On the May 4th episode of Raw, Cesaro and Kidd defeated The Ascension after Kidd dropkicked Viktor while Cesaro was performing his Cesaro Swing. Afterwards, they had a confrontation with The New Day backstage, leading the fans in chanting "New Day sucks" to The New Day's trademark clapping. At Payback, Kidd and Cesaro challenged The New Day for the WWE Tag Team Championships in a two out of three falls match. The duo scored the first fall of the match, but ultimately lost the second and third falls (the third fall being made by Xavier Woods, who wasn't one of the legal participants in the match), failing to recapture the titles. It was announced Kidd and Cesaro would take part in the first-ever Tag Team Elimination Chamber match for the titles at Elimination Chamber on May 31, but they failed to win as they were the fourth team eliminated. On June 7, WWE announced that Kidd had suffered a neck/spinal injury during a dark match with Samoa Joe a week prior. Kidd announced that he would be out of action for over a year. He later retired on June 29, 2017, becoming a backstage producer for the company. Kidd's retirement effectively ended any chances of reformation.

Championships and accomplishments 
 WWE
 WWE Tag Team Championship (1 time)

References 

WWE teams and stables